Rodrigo y Gabriela (Rodrigo and Gabriela) are a Mexican acoustic guitar duo whose music is influenced by a number of genres including nuevo flamenco, rock, and heavy metal. The duo's recordings consist largely of instrumental duets on the flamenco guitar. Currently residing in Mexico City, they began their career in Dublin, Ireland, during an eight-year stay. They have released five studio albums, three live albums and one EP. In 2011, they collaborated with Hans Zimmer on the Pirates of the Caribbean: On Stranger Tides soundtrack while also contributing to the soundtrack for Puss in Boots. They have toured internationally and in May 2010, performed at The White House for President Barack Obama. 
In January 2020, their fifth studio album Mettavolution won a Grammy Award for the Best Contemporary Instrumental Album at the 62nd Annual Grammy Awards.

Origins
Rodrigo Sánchez (born 9 January 1974) and Gabriela Quintero (born 11 June 1973) grew up in middle-class families in Mexico City. Their parents listened to flamenco, jazz, and rock music, but they both enjoyed heavy metal bands like Metallica, which proved influential to Rodrigo and Gabriela.

Rodrigo and Gabriela met at the age of 15, at 'la casa de la cultura' (House of Culture) in Mexico City, where Rodrigo's brother was the director. Quintero was in a drama class and at the suggestion of his brother, Rodrigo met up with her. She remembers "this 15-year-old boy there, dressed in a black ... with messy hair. Yet he was different to the other metal-heads his age: he seemed very serious and didn't drink or smoke". The two bonded over their interest in music and they soon became a couple.

In the early 1990s, Sánchez formed a heavy metal band called Tierra Ácida (Acid Land) with his brother. Quintero joined them in 1993 "as they couldn't get a guitarist who would please Rodrigo". When a record deal for the band fell through in 1997, Sánchez and Quintero left Mexico City for the resort town of Ixtapa on the Pacific coast of Mexico. They played in beach-side bars and hotels for nine months where "we wanted to play a different kind of music, something we could make as our own".

Sánchez and Quintero dated for many years before ending their relationship (but not their musical partnership) in 2012.  "We're now better friends by far," said Quintero.  "We no longer behave like 15-year-olds and it's allowed us to grow up."

Career

Growing frustrated with the limited scope of the domestic Mexican rock scene, the duo moved to Europe. After travelling around, they took up residence in Dublin, Ireland, in 1999, despite not speaking any English. Playing live gigs in various pubs and busking on Grafton Street where they began to play "many cover songs, which we enjoyed. Then we began to put in our own songs, and we've built up our repertoire from there". They became friends with fellow musician Damien Rice who invited them to open for one of his shows. He also introduced the duo to Niall Muckian, who became their manager. In the first half of 2001 they recorded a 9-track demo called Foc of their own material supplemented by some covers, also featuring an appearance by Zoe Conway.

As interest in the band grew, it was decided to re-record the songs on the demo as re-Foc in 2002 with a number of friends, including Lisa Hannigan who provided vocal stylings and Conway, who by now also was a feature of the live set-up of the duo. The album appeared on Muckian's own Rubyworks Records as he found that "because it is all instrumental, we found it hard to get major-label interest or any radio-play, so I put it out myself". As interest grew, the duo were offered further support-slots, which resulted in an eight-track live-album recorded in Dublin and Manchester, released in 2004.

The eponymous album, Rodrigo y Gabriela, entered the Irish Albums Chart at #1 beating Arctic Monkeys and Johnny Cash to the top spot. It was released internationally on March 13, 2006, having been given an earlier Irish release. Rodrigo y Gabriela, which was produced by John Leckie, includes covers of Led Zeppelin's "Stairway to Heaven" and Metallica's "Orion". The duo lists Metallica as being among their key influences, alongside other heavy metal bands such as Megadeth, Slayer, Testament and Overkill. The other tracks are original works inspired by the places they have been and the people they have met.

The duo had their national American TV debut on Late Show with David Letterman on December 18, 2006, performing "Diablo Rojo". Their song "Tamacun" featured in the pilot episode of AMC's Breaking Bad in January 2008. Live in Japan was released on October 20, 2008, in the United Kingdom, and includes 14 tracks, and a bonus DVD containing five videos. The Led Zeppelin cover can be found on the album Rhythms del Mundo Classics. Their feature on MTV gave them a huge boost in popularity in the United States. This led to a feature on Nightmare Revisited, a tribute album to Danny Elfman's music from Tim Burton's The Nightmare Before Christmas. The duo performed an instrumental version of "Oogie Boogie's Song."

They released a new album, 11:11, in September, 2009. Alex Skolnick of Testament guests on the album, as do Strunz & Farah.  Upon the release of the new album, they received much mainstream American popularity and were the featured music on Monday Night Football on October 12, 2009, as they celebrated Latino Heritage Month.

Their song "Santo Domingo" was chosen as the Starbucks iTunes Pick of the Week for November 10, 2009. The duo was the musical guest on The Late Late Show with Craig Ferguson that aired on CBS-TV on October 28, 2009, and was re-run on December 29, 2009.  They performed "Buster Voodoo."  They performed on Jools Holland's Annual Hootenanny on December 31, 2009.

The duo was the musical guest on The Tonight Show with Jay Leno that aired on NBC on March 23, 2010, to promote their album 11:11 and on Lopez Tonight which aired on TBS March 25, 2010.  They headlined the West Holts stage on the Sunday night at Glastonbury 2010 and played the King Tuts Tent at T In The Park on 10 July 2010. They also had a spot on the main stage at Latitude festival that same July and they managed to draw in a huge crowd.

In 2010, Rodrigo y Gabriela contributed a live version of their song "Hora Zero" to the Enough Project and Downtown Records' Raise Hope for Congo compilation. Proceeds from the compilation fund efforts to make the protection and empowerment of Congo's women a priority, as well as inspire individuals around the world to raise their voice for peace in the Congo.

They played the Nice Jazz Festival on 23 July 2010, and the McMenamin's Edgefield outdoor concert in Portland, Oregon on August 14, 2010, as well as the Ravinia Festival on August 28, 2010, and The Tonight Show with Jay Leno on September 30, 2010. In September, 2010, the duo announced a hiatus from touring due to stress injuries caused by Gabriela's heavily percussive style of playing. However, they did manage to play five sold-out nights at Shepherd's Bush in London.

On January 20, 2011, Rodrigo y Gabriela entered the studio with Hans Zimmer to write and record sessions of the score from Pirates of the Caribbean: On Stranger Tides. The soundtrack was released on May 17, 2011, three days before the film's general release. On July 9, 2011, Rodrigo Y Gabriela performed a live set for Guitar Center Sessions on DirecTV. The episode included an interview with program host, Nic Harcourt. On July 25, 2011, Rodrigo y Gabriela released another live album entitled Live in France. Rodrigo y Gabriela were featured in the 2011 DreamWorks film Puss in Boots, scored by Henry Jackman. During 2011, Rodrigo y Gabriela recorded in Havana, Cuba, with C.U.B.A., a 13-piece Cuban orchestra, and special guest musicians (Anoushka Shankar on sitar and Le Trio Joubran on oud).

In January 2012 they released Area 52, their first album backed by other musicians. The tracks on the album are mostly re-worked versions of songs that have appeared on their duo albums, Rodrigo y Gabriela and 11:11. Reviews were mixed, with some tracks criticised for the backing band drowning out the guitar work that fans love but others praised where the guitar workouts "are allowed space to breathe by lighter salsa-style backing."

In April 2014, Rodrigo y Gabriela released their fourth studio album, entitled 9 Dead Alive. 
Their fifth studio album Mettavolution was released by ATO Records on April 26, 2019 and includes a cover of the Pink Floyd song "Echoes". In January 2020, Mettavolution won a Grammy Award for 'Best Contemporary Instrumental Album' 62nd Annual Grammy Awards. In 2021, the duo contributed a cover of the Metallica song "The Struggle Within" to the charity tribute album The Metallica Blacklist.

Style
Reviewing one of their gigs, The Independent noted that "Rodrigo y Gabriela's secret is maybe quite simple. They are resourceful musicians, and are open-hearted, happy entertainers. That, very often, is what people want." Both Rodrigo and Gabriela play Yamaha NX series electro nylon string guitars exclusively. Rodrigo plays the slimmer neck NTX1200 and Gabriela plays the more traditional sized NCX2000 and NCX1200.

Discography

Self-released albums
Foc (April 2001)

Studio albums

Live albums

Extended plays
Live Session (2007)
Mettal (2020)
Jazz (2021)

Singles
"Mettavolution" - #25 on US Adult Alternative Songs

See also
New flamenco
Duofel
Lara & Reyes
Shahin & Sepehr
Strunz & Farah
Rumba flamenca
Young & Rollins

References

External links

 Official Rodrigo y Gabriela site
 Video Channel on MUZU TV
 Interview on WNYC's Soundcheck
 "The Musical Migration of Rodrigo y Gabriela" (Interview with Gabriela) in Irish Migration Studies in Latin America journal, March 2007
 Interview on NPR's All Things Considered, October 10, 2009
 Rodrigo y Gabriela Rock the White House
 Anil Prasad, "Rodrigo y Gabriela Raucous rhythms", Innerviews.org, 2006

Mexican guitarists
Mexican folk music groups
Mexican buskers
ATO Records artists
Rock music duos
Musical groups established in 2000
Mexican musical duos
Male–female musical duos